Fort Collins Museum of Discovery is an all-ages, science, history and cultural museum established in 2008 through a public-private partnership between the City of Fort Collins' Fort Collins Museum and nonprofit Discovery Science Center. The museum is located at 408 Mason Court, Fort Collins, CO 80524.

History

Exhibits
Natural Areas
Wild lands & Wildlife
Animal Encounters
The Tot Spot
Food, Forage, & Farm
First Peoples
Healthy Steps
Schatz Family Exploration Zone
People on the Move
Music & Sound Lab

Special Traveling Exhibits
Mental Health: Mind Matters hosted through January 2, 2022

OtterBox Digital Dome Theater
Films are shown in the 360-degree Dome theater. Films recently shown include:
One World, One Sky: Big Bird's Adventure
CAPCOM GO! The Apollo Story
The Sun, Our Living Star
Dream to Fly
Explore

Research
Fort Collins Museum of Discovery archives house photographs, books, and other materials covering local history. Collections include approximately 38,000 objects.

References

External links

 FCMoD Facebook
 FCMoD Twitter

History museums in Colorado
Science museums in Colorado
Institutions accredited by the American Alliance of Museums
Culture of Fort Collins, Colorado
Natural history museums in Colorado
Buildings and structures in Fort Collins, Colorado